Ateşan Aybars (born 4 September 1949) is a Turkish economist and TV celebrity, CTA and Biomedical Engineer. He is graduated from Istanbul Technical University in 1973. After working as Commodity trading advisor in Ontario Securities Commission between 1985-1989 for 5 years, he finished his master thesis about "Conductivity Effects of Temperature". He worked for several newspapers as columnist and as a commentator economist for NTV, he is currently working for BloombergHT as commentator.

Selected publications

Books 

 Finansal Piyasalarda Zihin Kontrolü (2017)
 Meslek Olarak Opsiyon İşlemleri (2019)
 Karmaşıklık Ekonomisi (2021)

Bibliography 
 Richbars Technical Trader (1985)
 İMKB Uygulamalı Teknik Analiz (1992)

References

External links
 http://www.dunyastore.com/?urun-4556-IMKB-Modern-Teknik-Analiz-br--Atesan-Aybars.html
 http://www.nadirkitap.com/modern-teknik-analiz-imkb-uygulamali-atesan-aybars-kitap330143.html
 http://www.bloomberght.com/yorum/atesan-aybars/1239739-haftalik-yorum
 Website

1949 births
Turkish economists
Istanbul Technical University alumni
Living people